Hartford & Hartford is a bluegrass album by John Hartford and his son, Jamie Hartford, released in 1991 (see 1991 in music).

Track listing
 "Love Grown Cold" (Johnny Bond) – 2:55
 "Run Little Rabbit" (David Akeman) – 1:34
 "Killing Floor" (Howlin' Wolf) – 3:00
 "When the Roses Bloom in Dixieland" (A. P. Carter) – 4:30
 "New Love" (John Hartford) – 2:56
 "Sweet Sunny South" – 4:43
 "Painful Memories" (Jamie Hartford) – 2:48
 "Nobody's Darling But Mine" (Jimmie Davis) – 3:14
 "Put All Your Troubles Away" (John Hartford) – 2:04
 "I Know You Don't Love Me No More" (John Hartford, Benny Martin, Jeannie Seely) – 3:10
 "She's Still Gonna Break Your Heart" (Jamie Hartford) – 1:54

Personnel
John Hartford – fiddle, banjo, vocals
Jamie Hartford – vocals, mandolin
Mark Howard – guitar
Roy Huskey, Jr. – bass
Kenny Malone – percussion
Production notes:
Jack Clement – executive producer
John Hartford – producer, lettering, art direction
Mark Howard – producer, engineer, mixing
Dave Ferguson – engineer
Denny Purcell – mastering

References

John Hartford albums
1991 albums